Multituberculata (commonly known as multituberculates, named for the multiple tubercles of their teeth) is an extinct order of rodent-like mammals with a fossil record spanning over 130 million years. They first appeared in the Middle Jurassic, and reached a peak diversity during the Late Cretaceous and Paleocene. They eventually declined from the mid Paleocene onwards, disappearing from the known fossil record in the late Eocene. They are the most diverse order of Mesozoic mammals with more than 200 species known, ranging from mouse-sized to beaver-sized. These species occupied a diversity of ecological niches, ranging from burrow-dwelling to squirrel-like arborealism to jerboa-like hoppers. Multituberculates are usually placed as crown mammals outside either of the two main groups of living mammals—Theria, including placentals and marsupials, and Monotremata—but usually as closer to Theria than to monotremes. They are considered to be closely related to Euharamiyida and Gondwanatheria as part of Allotheria.

Description 

The multituberculates had a cranial and dental anatomy superficially similar to rodents such as mice and rats, with cheek-teeth separated from the chisel-like front teeth by a wide tooth-less gap (the diasteme). Each cheek-tooth displayed several rows of small cusps (or tubercles, hence the name) that operated against similar rows in the teeth of the jaw; the exact homology of these cusps to therian ones is still a matter of debate. Unlike rodents, which have ever-growing teeth, multituberculates underwent dental replacement patterns typical to most mammals (though in at least some species the lower incisors continued to erupt long after the root's closure). Multituberculates are notable for the presence of a massive fourth lower premolar, the plagiaulacoid; other mammals, like Plesiadapiformes and diprotodontian marsupials, also have similar premolars in both upper and lower jaws, but in multituberculates this tooth is massive and the upper premolars aren't modified this way. In basal multituberculates all three lower premolars were plagiaulacoids, increasing in size posteriorly, but in Cimolodonta only the fourth lower premolar remained, with the third one remaining only as a vestigial peg-like tooth, and in several taxa like taeniolabidoideans, the plagiaulacoid disappeared entirely or was reconverted into a molariform tooth.

Unlike rodents and similar therians, multituberculates had a palinal jaw stroke (front-to-back), instead of a propalinal (back-to-front) or transverse (side-to-side) one; as a consequence, their jaw musculature and cusp orientation is radically different. Palinal jaw strokes are almost entirely absent in modern mammals (with the possible exception of the dugong), but are also present in haramiyidans, argyrolagoideans and tritylodontids, the former historically united with multituberculates on that basis. Multituberculate mastication is thought to have operated in a two stroke cycle: first, food held in place by the last upper premolar was sliced by the bladelike lower pre-molars as the dentary moved orthally (upward). Then the lower jaw moved palinally, grinding the food between the molar cusp rows.

The structure of the pelvis in the Multituberculata suggests that they gave birth to tiny helpless, underdeveloped young, similar to modern marsupials, such as kangaroos. However, a 2022 study reveals that they might actually have had long gestation periods like placentals.

At least two lineages developed hypsodonty, in which tooth enamel extends beyond the gumline: lambdopsalid taeniolabidoideans and sudamericid gondwanatheres.

Studies published in 2018 demonstrated that multituberculates had relatively complex brains, some braincase regions even absent in therian mammals.

Evolution

Multituberculates first appear in the fossil record during the Jurassic period, and then survived and even dominated for over one hundred million years, longer than any other order of mammaliforms, including placental mammals. The earliest known multituberculates are from the Middle Jurassic (Bathonian ~166-168 million years ago) of England and Russia, including Hahnotherium and Kermackodon from the Forest Marble Formation of England, and Tashtykia and Tagaria from the Itat Formation of Russia. These forms are only known from isolated teeth, which bear close similarity to those of euharamyidans, which they are suspected to be closely related. During the Late Jurassic and Early Cretaceous, primitive multituberculates, collectively grouped into the paraphyletic "Plagiaulacida" were abundant and widespread across Laurasia (including Europe, Asia and North America). During the Aptian stage of the Early Cretaceous, the advanced subgroup Cimolodonta appeared in North America, characterised by a reduced number of lower premolars, with a blade-like lower fourth premolar. By the early Late Cretaceous (Cenomanian) Cimolodonta had replaced all other multituberculate lineages.

During the Late Cretaceous, multituberculates experienced an adaptive radiation, corresponding with a shift towards herbivory. Multituberculates reached their peak diversity during the early Paleocene, shortly after the Cretaceous–Paleogene extinction event, but declined from the mid Paleocene onwards, likely due to competition with placental mammals such as rodents and ungulates, the group finally became extinct in the Late Eocene. There are some isolated records of multituberculates from the Southern Hemisphere, including the cimolodontan Corriebaatar from the Early Cretaceous of Australia, and fragmentary remains from the Late Cretaceous Maevarano Formation of Madagascar. The family Ferugliotheriidae from the Late Cretaceous of South America, traditionally considered gondwanatherians, may actually be cimolodontan multituberculates.

During the Late Cretaceous and Paleocene the multituberculates radiated into a wide variety of morphotypes, including the squirrel-like arboreal ptilodonts. The peculiar shape of their last lower premolar is their most outstanding feature. These teeth were larger and more elongated than the other cheek-teeth and had an occlusive surface forming a serrated slicing blade. Though it can be assumed that this was used for crushing seeds and nuts, it is believed that most small multituberculates also supplemented their diet with insects, worms, and fruits. Tooth marks attributed to multituberculates are known on Champsosaurus fossils, indicating that at least some of these mammals were scavengers. A ptilodont that thrived in North America was Ptilodus. Thanks to the well-preserved Ptilodus specimens found in the Bighorn Basin, Wyoming, we know that these multituberculates were able to abduct and adduct their big toes, and thus that their foot mobility was similar to that of modern squirrels, which descend trees head first.

Another group of multituberculates, the taeniolabids, were heavier and more massively built, indicating that they lived a fully terrestrial life.
They reached their highest diversity in Asia during the late Cretaceous and Paleocene, which suggests that they originated from there.

Classification
Multituberculate is generally placed in the Allotheria alongside Euharamiyida, a clade of mammals known from the Middle Jurassic to Early Cretaceous of the Asia and possibly Europe that several morphological similarities to multituberculates.

Gondwanatheria is a monophyletic group of allotherians that was diverse in the Late Cretaceous of South America, India, Madagascar and possibly Africa and occurs onwards into the Paleogene of South America and Antarctica. Their placement within Allotheria is highly controversial, with some phylogenies recovering the group as deeply nested within multituberculates, while others recover them as a distinct branch of allotherians separate from multituberculates.
In their 2001 study, Kielan-Jaworowska and Hurum found that most multituberculates could be referred to two suborders: "Plagiaulacida" and Cimolodonta. The exception is the genus Arginbaatar, which shares characteristics with both groups.

"Plagiaulacida" is paraphyletic, representing the more primitive evolutionary grade. Its members are the more basal Multituberculata. Chronologically, they ranged from perhaps the Middle Jurassic until the mid-Cretaceous. This group is further subdivided into three informal groupings: the allodontid line, the paulchoffatiid line, and the plagiaulacid line.

Cimolodonta is, apparently, a natural (monophyletic) suborder. This includes the more derived Multituberculata, which have been identified from the lower Cretaceous to the Eocene. The superfamilies Djadochtatherioidea, Taeniolabidoidea, Ptilodontoidea are recognized, as is the Paracimexomys group. Additionally, there are the families Cimolomyidae, Boffiidae, Eucosmodontidae, Kogaionidae, Microcosmodontidae and the two genera Uzbekbaatar and Viridomys. More precise placement of these types awaits further discoveries and analysis.

Taxonomy

Based on the combined works of Mikko's Phylogeny Archive and Paleofile.com.

Suborder †Plagiaulacida Simpson 1925
 Genus ?†Argillomys Cifelli, Gordon & Lipka 2013
 Species †Argillomys marylandensis Cifelli, Gordon & Lipka 2013
 Genus ?†Janumys Eaton & Cifelli 2001
 Species †Janumys erebos Eaton & Cifelli 2001
 Super family †Allodontoidea Marsh 1889
 Genus †?Glirodon Engelmann & Callison, 2001
 Species †G. grandis Engelmann & Callison, 2001
 Family †Arginbaataridae Hahn & Hahn, 1983
 Genus †Arginbaatar Trofimov, 1980
 Species †A. dmitrievae Trofimov, 1980
 Family †Zofiabaataridae Bakker, 1992
 Genus †Zofiabaatar Bakker & Carpenter, 1990
 Species †Z. pulcher Bakker & Carpenter, 1990
 Family †Allodontidae Marsh, 1889
 Genus †Passumys Cifelli, Davis & Sames 2014
 Species †Passumys angelli Cifelli, Davis & Sames 2014
 Genus †Ctenacodon Marsh, 1879
 Species †C. serratus Marsh, 1879
 Species †C. nanus Marsh, 1881
 Species †C. laticeps (Marsh, 1881) [Allodon laticeps Marsh 1881] 
 Species †C. scindens Simpson, 1928
 Genus †Psalodon Simpson, 1926
 Species †P. potens (Marsh, 1887) [Ctenacodon potens Marsh 1887]
 Species †P. fortis (Marsh, 1887) Simpson 1929 [Allodon fortis Marsh 1887]
 Species †P. marshi Simpson, 1929
 Super family †Paulchoffatioidea Hahn 1969 sensu Hahn & Hahn 2003
 Genus ?†Mojo Hahn, LePage & Wouters 1987
 Species †Mojo usuratus Hahn, LePage & Wouters 1987
 Genus ?†Rugosodon Yuan et al., 2013
 Species †Rugosodon eurasiaticus Yuan et al., 2013
 Family †Pinheirodontidae Hahn & Hahn, 1999
 Genus †Bernardodon Hahn & Hahn, 1999
 Species †B. atlanticus Hahn & Hahn, 1999
 Species †B. sp. Hahn & Hahn, 1999
 Genus †Cantalera Badiola, Canudo & Cuenca-Bescos, 2008
 Species †Cantalera abadi Badiola, Canudo & Cuenca-Bescos, 2008
 Genus †Ecprepaulax Hahn & Hahn, 1999
 Species †E. anomala Hahn & Hahn, 1999
 Genus †Gerhardodon Kielan-Jaworowska & Ensom, 1992
 Species †G. purbeckensis Kielan-Jaworowska & Ensom, 1992
 Genus †Iberodon Hahn & Hahn, 1999
 Species †I. quadrituberculatus Hahn & Hahn, 1999
 Genus †Lavocatia Canudo & Cuenca-Bescós, 1996
 Species †L. alfambrensis Canudo & Cuenca-Bescós, 1996
 Genus †Pinheirodon Hahn & Hahn, 1999
 Species †P. pygmaeus Hahn & Hahn, 1999
 Species †P. vastus Hahn & Hahn, 1999
 Family †Paulchoffatiidae Hahn, 1969
 Genus ?†Galveodon Hahn & Hahn, 1992
 Species †G. nannothus Hahn & Hahn, 1992
 Genus ?†Sunnyodon Kielan-Jaworowska & Ensom, 1992
 Species †S. notleyi Kielan-Jaworowska & Ensom, 1992
 subfamily †Paulchoffatiinae Hahn, 1971
 Genus †Paulchoffatia Kühne, 1961
 Species †P. delgador Kühne, 1961
 Genus †Pseudobolodon Hahn, 1977
 Species †P. oreas Hahn, 1977
 Species †P. krebsi Hahn & Hahn, 1994
 Genus †Henkelodon Hahn, 1987
 Species †H. naias Hahn, 1987
 Genus †Guimarotodon Hahn, 1969
 Species †G. leiriensis Hahn, 1969
 Genus †Meketibolodon (Hahn, 1978) Hahn, 1993
 Species †M. robustus (Hahn, 1978) Hahn, 1993 [Pseudobolodon robusutus Hahn 1978]
 Genus †Plesiochoffatia Hahn & Hahn, 1999 [Parachoffatia Hahn & Hahn 1998 non Mangold 1970]
 Species †P. thoas (Hahn & Hahn, 1998) Hahn & Hahn 1999 [Parachoffatia thoa Hahn & Hahn 1998]
 Species †P. peparethos (Hahn & Hahn, 1998) Hahn & Hahn 1999 [Parachoffatia peparethos Hahn & Hahn 1998]
 Species †P. staphylos (Hahn & Hahn, 1998) Hahn & Hahn 1999 [Parachoffatia staphylos Hahn & Hahn 1998]
 Genus †Xenachoffatia Hahn & Hahn, 1998
 Species †X. oinopion Hahn & Hahn, 1998
 Genus †Bathmochoffatia Hahn & Hahn, 1998
 Species †B. hapax Hahn & Hahn, 1998
 Genus †Kielanodon Hahn, 1987
 Species †K. hopsoni Hahn, 1987
 Genus †Meketichoffatia Hahn, 1993
 Species †M. krausei Hahn, 1993
 Genus †Renatodon Hahn, 2001
 Species †Renatodon amalthea Hahn, 2001
 Subfamily †Kuehneodontinae Hahn, 1971
 Genus †Kuehneodon Hahn, 1969
 Species †K. dietrichi Hahn, 1969
 Species †K. barcasensis Hahn & Hahn, 2001
 Species †K. dryas Hahn, 1977
 Species †K. guimarotensis Hahn, 1969
 Species †K. hahni Antunes, 1988
 Species †K. simpsoni Hahn, 1969
 Species †K. uniradiculatus Hahn, 1978

 Super family †Plagiaulacoidea Ameghino, 1894
 Family †Plagiaulacidae Gill, 1872 sensu Kielan-Jaworowska & Hurum, 2001 [Bolodontidae Osborn 1887] 
 Genus ?†Morrisonodon Hahn & Hahn, 2004
 Species †Morrisonodon brentbaatar (Bakker, 1998) Hahn & Hahn, 2004 [Ctenacodon brentbaatar Bakker, 1998]
 Genus †Plagiaulax Falconer, 1857
 Species †P. becklesii Falconer, 1857
 Species †P. dawsoni Woodward, 1891 [Plioprion dawsoni Woodward, 1891; Loxaulax dawsoni (Woodward, 1891) Sloan, 1979]
 Genus †Bolodon Owen, 1871 [Plioprion Cope, 1884]
 Species †B. crassidens Owen, 1871
 Species †B. falconeri Owen, 1871 [Pligiaulax falconeri Owen, 1871; Plioprion falconeri (Owen, 1871)]
 Species †B. hydei Cifelli, Davis & Sames, 2014
 Species †B. minor Falconer, 1857 [Pligiaulax minor Falconer, 1857; Plioprion minor (Falconer, 1857)]
 Species †B. osborni Simpson, 1928 [Plioprion osborni (Simpson, 1928); Ctenacodon osborni Simpson, 1928]
 Species ?†B. elongatus Simpson, 1928
 Family †Eobaataridae Kielan-Jaworowska, Dashzeveg & Trofimov, 1987
 Genus †Eobaatar Kielan-Jaworowska, Dashzeveg & Trofimov, 1987
 Species †E. clemensi Sweetman, 2009
 Species †E. hispanicus Hahn & Hahn, 1992
 Species †E. magnus Kielan-Jaworowska, Dashzeveg & Trofimov, 1987
 Species †E. minor Kielan-Jaworowska, Dashzeveg & Trofimov, 1987
 Species †E. pajaronensis Hahn & Hahn, 2001
 Genus †Hakusanobaatar Kusuhashi et al., 2008
 Species †H. matsuoi Kusuhashi et al., 2008
 Genus †Heishanobaatar Kusuhashi et al., 2010
 Species †H. triangulus Kusuhashi et al., 2010
 Genus †Iberica Badiola et al., 2011
 Species †Iberica hahni Badiola et al., 2011
 Genus †Liaobaatar Kusuhashi et al., 2009
 Species †L. changi Kusuhashi et al., 2009
 Genus †Loxaulax Simpson, 1928 [Parendotherium Crusafont Pairó & Adrover, 1966]
 Species †L. valdensis (Woodward, 1911) Simpson, 1928[Dipriodon valdensis Woodward, 1911] 
 Species †L. herreroi (Crusafont Pairó & Adrover, 1966) [Parendotherium herreroi Crusafont Pairó & Adrover 1966]
 Genus †Monobaatar Kielan-Jaworowska, Dashzeveg & Trofimov, 1987
 Species †M. mimicus Kielan-Jaworowska, Dashzeveg & Trofimov, 1987
 Genus †Sinobaatar Hu & Wang, 2002
 Species †S. lingyuanensis Hu & Wang, 2002
 Species †S. xiei Kusuhashi et al., 2009
 Species †S. fuxinensis Kusuhashi et al., 2009
 Genus †Tedoribaatar Kusuhashi et al., 2008
 Species †T. reini Kusuhashi et al., 2008
 Genus †Teutonodon Martin et al., 2016
 Species †Teutonodon langenbergensis Martin et al. 2016
 Family †Albionbaataridae Kielan-Jaworowska & Ensom, 1994
 Genus †Albionbaatar Kielan-Jaworowska & Ensom, 1994
 Species †A. denisae Kielan-Jaworowska & Ensom, 1994
 Genus †Kielanobaatar Kusuhashi et al., 2010
 Species †K. badaohaoensis Kusuhashi et al., 2010
 Genus †Proalbionbaatar Hahn & Hahn, 1998
 Species †P. plagiocyrtus Hahn & Hahn, 1998
 Suborder †Gondwanatheria McKenna 1971 [Gondwanatheroidea Krause & Bonaparte 1993]
 Family †Groeberiidae Patterson, 1952
 Genus †Groeberia Patterson 1952
 Species †G. minoprioi Ryan Patterson, 1952
 Species †G. pattersoni G. G. Simpson, 1970
 Genus †Klohnia Flynn & Wyss 1999
 Species †K. charrieri Flynn & Wyss 1999
 Species †K. major Goin et al., 2010
 Genus ?†Epiklohnia Goin et al., 2010
 Species †Epiklohnia verticalis Goin et al., 2010
 Genus ?†Praedens Goin et al., 2010
 Species †Praedens aberrans Goin et al., 2010
 Family †Ferugliotheriidae Bonaparte, 1986
 Genus †Ferugliotherium Bonaparte, 1986a [Vucetichia Bonaparte, 1990]
 †Ferugliotherium windhauseni Bonaparte, 1986a [Vucetichia gracilis Bonaparte, 1990]
 Genus †Trapalcotherium Rougier et al., 2008
 †Trapalcotherium matuastensis Rougier et al., 2008
 Family †Sudamericidae Scillato-Yané & Pascual, 1984 [Gondwanatheridae Bonaparte, 1986; Patagonidae Pascual & Carlini, 1987]
 Genus †Greniodon Goin et al., 2012
 †Greniodon sylvanicus Goin et al., 2012
 Genus †Vintana Krause et al., 2014
 †Vintana sertichi Krause et al., 2014
 Genus †Dakshina Wilson, Das Sarama & Anantharaman, 2007
 †Dakshina jederi Wilson, Das Sarama & Anantharaman, 2007
 Genus †Gondwanatherium Bonaparte, 1986
 †Gondwanatherium patagonicum Bonaparte, 1986
 Genus †Sudamerica Scillato-Yané & Pascual, 1984
 †Sudamerica ameghinoi Scillato-Yané & Pascual, 1984
 Genus †Lavanify Krause et al., 1997
 †Lavanify miolaka Krause et al., 1997
 Genus †Bharattherium Prasad et al., 2007
 †Bharattherium bonapartei Prasad et al.,, 2007
 Genus †Patagonia Pascual & Carlini' 1987
 †Patagonia peregrina Pascual & Carlini' 1987

 Suborder †Cimolodonta  McKenna, 1975
 Genus ?†Allocodon non Marsh, 1881
 Species †A. fortis Marsh, 1889
 Species †A. lentus Marsh, 1892 [Cimolomys lentus]
 Species †A. pumilis Marsh, 1892 [Cimolomys pumilus]
 Species †A. rarus Marsh, 1889
 Genus ?†Ameribaatar Eaton & Cifelli, 2001
 Species †A. zofiae Eaton & Cifelli, 2001
 Genus ?†Bubodens Wilson, 1987
 Species †Bubodens magnus Wilson, 1987
 Genus ?†Clemensodon Krause, 1992
 Species †Clemensodon megaloba Krause, 1992 [Kimbetohia cambi, in partim]
 Genus ?†Fractinus Higgins 2003
 Species †Fractinus palmorum Higgins, 2003
 Genus ?†Uzbekbaatar Kielan-Jaworowska & Nesov, 1992
 Species †Uzbekbaatar kizylkumensis Kielan-Jaworowska & Nesov, 1992
 Genus ?†Viridomys Fox 1971
 Species †Viridomys orbatus Fox 1971
 Family †Corriebaataridae Rich et al., 2009
 Genus ?†Corriebaatar Rich et al., 2009 
 Species †Corriebaatar marywaltersae Rich et al., 2009
 Paracimexomys group
 Genus Paracimexomys Archibald, 1982
 Species? †P. crossi Cifelli, 1997
 Species? †P. dacicus Grigorescu & Hahn, 1989
 Species? †P. oardaensis (Codrea et al., 2014) [Barbatodon oardaensis Codrea et al., 2014]
 Species †P. magnus (Sahni, 1972) Archibald, 1982 [Cimexomys magnus Sahni, 1972]
 Species †P. magister (Fox, 1971) Archibald, 1982 [Cimexomys magister Fox, 1971]
 Species †P. perplexus Eaton & Cifelli, 2001
 Species †P. robisoni Eaton & Nelson, 1991
 Species †P. priscus (Lillegraven, 1969) Archibald, 1982 [Cimexomys priscus Lillegraven, 1969; genotype Paracimexomys sensu Eaton & Cifelli, 2001]
 Species †P. propriscus Hunter, Heinrich & Weishampel 2010
 Genus Cimexomys Sloan & Van Valen, 1965
 Species †C. antiquus Fox, 1971
 Species †C. gregoryi Eaton, 1993
 Species †C. judithae Sahni, 1972 [Paracimexomys judithae (Sahni, 1972) Archibald, 1982]
 Species †C. arapahoensis Middleton & Dewar, 2004
 Species †C. minor Sloan & Van Valen, 1965
 Species? †C. gratus (Jepson, 1930) Lofgren, 1995 [Cimexomys hausoi Archibald, 1983; Eucosmodon gratus Jepson, 1930; Mesodma ambigua? Jepson, 1940; Stygimus gratus Jepson, 1930]
 Genus †Bryceomys Eaton, 1995
 Species †B. fumosus Eaton, 1995
 Species †B. hadrosus Eaton, 1995
 Species †B. intermedius Eaton & Cifelli, 2001
 Genus †Cedaromys Eaton & Cifelli, 2001
 Species †C. bestia (Eaton & Nelson, 1991) Eaton & Cifelli, 2001 [Paracimexomys bestia Eaton & Nelson, 1991]
 Species †C. hutchisoni Eaton 2002
 Species †C. minimus Eaton 2009
 Species †C. parvus Eaton & Cifelli, 2001
 Genus †Dakotamys Eaton, 1995
 Species? †D. sp. Eaton, 1995
 Species †D. malcolmi Eaton, 1995
 Species †D. shakespeari Eaton 2013
 Family †Boffidae Hahn & Hahn, 1983 sensu Kielan-Jaworowska & Hurum 2001
 Genus †Boffius Vianey-Liaud, 1979
 Species †Boffius splendidus Vianey-Liaud, 1979 [Boffiidae Hahn & Hahn, 1983 sensu Kielan-Jaworowska & Hurum, 2001]
 Family †Cimolomyidae Marsh, 1889 sensu Kielan-Jaworowska & Hurum, 2001
 Genus †Paressodon Wilson, Dechense & Anderson, 2010
 Species †Paressodon nelsoni Wilson, Dechense & Anderson, 2010
 Genus †Cimolomys Marsh, 1889 [?Allacodon Marsh, 1889; Selenacodon Marsh, 1889]
 Species †C. clarki Sahni, 1972
 Species †C. gracilis Marsh, 1889 [Cimolomys digona Marsh, 1889; Meniscoessus brevis; Ptilodus gracilis Osborn, 1893 non Gidley 1909; Selenacodon brevis Marsh, 1889]
 Species †C. trochuus Lillegraven, 1969
 Species †C. milliensis Eaton, 1993a
 Species ?†C. bellus Marsh, 1889
 Genus ?†Essonodon Simpson, 1927
 Species †E. browni Simpson, 1927 [cimolodontidae? Kielan-Jaworowska & Hurum 2001]
 Genus ?†Buginbaatar Kielan-Jaworowska & Sochava, 1969
 Species †Buginbaatar transaltaiensis Kielan-Jaworowska & Sochava, 1969
 Genus ?†Meniscoessus Cope, 1882 [Dipriodon Marsh, 1889; Tripriodon Marsh, 1889 nomen dubium; Triprotodon Chure & McIntosh, 1989 nomen dubium; Selenacodon Marsh, 1889, Halodon Marsh, 1889, Oracodon Marsh, 1889]
 Species †M. caperatus Marsh, 1889
 Species †M. collomensis Lillegraven, 1987
 Species †M. conquistus Cope 1882
 Species †M. ferox Fox, 1971a
 Species †M. intermedius Fox, 1976b
 Species †M. major (Russell, 1936) [Cimolomys major Russell 1937]
 Species †M. robustus (Marsh, 1889) [Dipriodon robustus Marsh 1889; Dipriodon lacunatus Marsh, 1889; Tripriodon coelatus Marsh, 1889; Meniscoessus coelatus Marsh, 1889; Selenacodon fragilis Marsh, 1889; Meniscoessus fragilis Marsh, 1889; Halodon sculptus (Marsh, 1889); Cimolomys sculptus Marsh, 1889; Meniscoessus sculptus Marsh, 1889; Oracodon anceps Marsh, 1889; Oracodon conulus Marsh, 1892; Meniscoessus borealis Simpson, 1927c; Meniscoessus greeni Wilson, 1987]
 Species †M. seminoensis Eberle & Lillegraven, 1998a
 Family †Kogaionidae Rãdulescu & Samson, 1996
 Genus †Kogaionon Rãdulescu & Samson, 1996
 Species †K. ungureanui Rãdulescu & Samson, 1996
 Genus †Hainina Vianey-Liaud, 1979
 Species †H. belgica Vianey-Liaud, 1979
 Species †H. godfriauxi Vianey-Liaud, 1979
 Species †H. pyrenaica Peláez-Campomanes, López-Martínez, Álvarez-Sierra & Daams, 2000
 Species †H. vianeyae Peláez-Campomanes, López-Martínez, Álvarez-Sierra & Daams, 2000
 Genus †Barbatodon Rãdulescu & Samson, 1986
 Species †B. transylvanicum Rãdulescu & Samson, 1986
 Family †Eucosmodontidae Jepsen, 1940 sensu Kielan-Jaworowska & Hurum, 2001 [Eucosmodontidae: Eucosmodontinae Jepsen, 1940 sensu McKenna & Bell, 1997]
 Genus †Eucosmodon Matthew & Granger, 1921
 Species †E. primus Granger & Simpson, 1929
 Species †E. americanus Cope, 1885
 Species †E. molestus Cope, 1869 [Neoplagiaulax molestus Cope, 1869]
 Genus †Stygimys Sloan & Van Valen, 1965
 Species †S. camptorhiza Johnston & Fox, 1984
 Species †S. cupressus Fox, 1981
 Species †S. kuszmauli [Eucosmodon kuszmauli]
 Species †S. jepseni Simpson, 1935
 Species †S. teilhardi Granger & Simpson, 1929
 Family †Microcosmodontidae Holtzman & Wolberg, 1977 [Eucosmodontidae: Microcosmodontinae Holtzman & Wolberg, 1977 sensu McKenna & Bell, 1997]
 Genus †PentacosmodonJepsen, 1940
 Species †P. pronus Jepsen, 1940 [Djadochtatheroid? (Kielan-Jaworowska & Hurum, 2001)]
 Genus †Acheronodon Archibald, 1982
 Species †A. garbani Archibald, 1982
 Genus †Microcosmodon Jepsen, 1930
 Species †M. conus Jepsen, 1930
 Species †M. rosei Krause, 1980
 Species †M. arcuatus Johnston & Fox, 1984
 Species †M. woodi Holtzman & Wolberg, 1977 [Eucosmodontine?]
 Species †M. harleyi Weil, 1998
 Superfamily †Ptilodontoidea Cope, 1887 sensu McKenna & Bell, 1997 e Kielan-Jaworowska & Hurum, 2001
 Family †Cimolodontidae Marsh, 1889 sensu Kielan-Jaworowska & Hurum, 2001
 Genus †Liotomus Lemoine, 1882 [Neoctenacodon Lemoine 1891] 
 Species? †L. marshi (Lemoine, 1882) Cope, 1884 [Neoctenacodon marshi Lemoine, 1882; Neoplagiaulax marshi (Lemoine 1882); Plagiaulax marshi (Lemoine 1882)] [Eucosmodontidae? McKenna & Bell, 1997]
 Genus †Yubaatar Xu et al., 2015
 Species †Yubaatar zhongyuanensis Xu et al., 2015
 Genus †Anconodon Jepsen, 1940
 Species? †A. lewisi (Simpson 1935) Sloan, 1987
 Species †A. gibleyi (Simpson, 1935) [Ptilodus gidleyi Simpson, 1935]
 Species †A. cochranensis (Russell, 1929) [Liotomus russelli (Simpson, 1935); Anconodon russelli (Simpson, 1935) Sloan, 1987; Ectopodon cochranensis (Russell, 1967)]
 Genus †Cimolodon Marsh, 1889 [Nanomys Marsh, 1889, Nanomyops Marsh, 1892]
 Species †C. agilis Marsh, 1889
 Species †C. foxi Eaton, 2002
 Species †C. gracilis Marsh, 1889
 Species †C. electus Fox, 1971
 Species †C. nitidus Marsh, 1889 [Allacodon rarus Marsh, 1892 sensu Clemens, 1964a; Nanomys minutus Marsh, 1889; Nanomyops minutus (Marsh, 1889) Marsh, 1892; Halodon serratus Marsh, 1889; Ptilodus serratus (Marsh, 1889) Gidley 1909]
 Species †C. parvus Marsh, 1889
 Species †C. peregrinus Donohue, Wilson & Breithaupt, 2013
 Species †C. similis Fox, 1971
 Species †C. wardi Eaton, 2006
 Family Incertae sedis
 Genus Neoliotomus Jepsen, 1930
 Species †N. conventus Jepsen, 1930
 Species †N. ultimus (Granger & Simpson, 1928)
 Family †Neoplagiaulacidae Ameghino, 1890 [Ptilodontidae: Neoplagiaulacinae Ameghino, 1890 sensu McKenna & Bell, 1997]
 Genus †Mesodma Jepsen, 1940
 Species? †M. hensleighi Lillegraven, 1969
 Species? †M. senecta Fox, 1971
 Species †M. ambigua Jepsen, 1940
 Species? †M. pygmaea Sloan, 1987
 Species †M. formosa (Marsh, 1889) [Halodon formosus Marsh, 1889]
 Species †M. primaeva (Lambe, 1902)
 Species †M. thompsoni Clemens, 1964
 Genus Ectypodus Matthew & Cranger, 1921 [Charlesmooria Kühne, 1969 ]
 Species †E. aphronorus Sloan, 1981
 Species? †E. childei Kühne, 1969
 Species? †E. elaphus Scott, 2005
 Species? †E. lovei (Sloan, 1966) Krishtlaka & Black, 1975
 Species †E. musculus Matthew & Granger, 1921
 Species †E. powelli Jepsen, 1940
 Species? †E. simpsoni Jepsen, 1930
 Species †E. szalayi Sloan, 1981
 Species †E. tardus Jepsen, 1930
 Genus †Mimetodon Jepsen, 1940
 Species †M. krausei Sloan, 1981
 Species †M. nanophus Holtzman, 1978 [Neoplagiaulax nanophus Holtzman, 1978]
 Species †M. siberlingi(Simpson, 1935) Schiebout, 1974
 Species †M. churchilli Jepsen, 1940
 Genus †Neoplagiaulax Lemoine, 1882
 Species †N. annae Vianey-Liaud, 1986
 Species? †N. burgessi Archibald, 1982
 Species †N. cimolodontoides Scott, 2005
 Species †N. copei Lemoine, 1885
 Species †N. donaldorum Scott & Krause, 2006
 Species †N. eocaenus Lemoine, 1880
 Species †N. grangeri Simpson, 1935
 Species †N. hazeni Jepsen, 1940
 Species †N. hunteri Krishtalka, 1973
 Species †N. jepi Sloan, 1987
 Species †N. kremnus Johnston & Fox, 1984
 Species †N. macintyrei Slaon, 1981
 Species †N. macrotomeus Wilson, 1956
 Species †N. mckennai Sloan, 1987
 Species †N. nelsoni Sloan, 1987
 Species †N. nicolai Vianey-Liaud, 1986
 Species †N. paskapooensis Scott, 2005
 Species? †N. serrator Scott, 2005
 Species †N. sylvani Vianey-Liaud, 1986
 Genus †Parectypodus Jepsen, 1930
 Species †P. armstrongi Johnston & Fox, 1984
 Species? †P. corystes Scott, 2003
 Species? †P. foxi Storer, 1991
 Species †P. laytoni Jepsen, 1940
 Species †P. lunatus Krause, 1982 [P. childei Kühne, 1969]
 Species †P. simpsoni Jepsen, 1940
 Species †P. sinclairi Simpson, 1935
 Species †P. sloani Schiebout, 1974
 Species †P. trovessartianus Cope, 1882 [P. trouessarti; Ptilodus; Mimetodon; Neoplagiaulax]
 Species †P. sylviae Rigsby, 1980 [Ectypodus sylviae Rigby, 1980]
 Species? †P. vanvaleni Sloan, 1981
 Genus †Cernaysia Vianey-Liaud, 1986
 Species †C. manueli Vianey-Liaud, 1986
 Species †C. davidi Vianey-Liaud, 1986
 Genus †Krauseia Vianey-Liaud, 1986
 Species †K. clemensi Sloan, 1981 [Parectypodus clemensi Sloan, 1981]
 Genus †XyronomysRigby, 1980
 Species †X. swainae Rigby, 1980 [Xironomys (sic); ?Eucosmodontidae]
 Genus †Xanclomys Rigby, 1980
 Species †X. mcgrewiRigby, 1980
 Genus †Mesodmops Tong & Wang, 1994
 Species †M. dawsonae Tong & Wang, 1994
 Family †Ptilodontidae Cope, 1887 [Ptilodontidae: Ptilodontinae Cope, 1887 sensu McKenna & Bell, 1997]
 Genus †Kimbetohia Simpson, 1936
 Species †K. cambi [Granger, Gregory & Colbert in Matthew, 1937, or Simpson, 1936]
 Species †K. sp. cf. K. cambi
 Genus †Ptilodus Cope, 1881 [Chirox Cope, 1884]
 Species? †P. fractus
 Species †P. kummae Krause, 1977
 Species †P. gnomus Scott, Fox & Youzwyshyn, 2002 [cf. Ectypodus hazeni (Jepsen, 1940) Gazin, 1956]
 Species †P. mediaevus Cope, 1881 [Ptilodus plicatus (Cope, 1884); Chirox plicatus Cope, 1884 P. ferronensis Gazin, 1941]
 Species †P. montanus Douglass, 1908 [P. gracilis Gidley, 1909; P. admiralis Hay, 1930]
 Species †P. tsosiensis Sloan, 1981
 Species †P. wyomingensis Jepsen, 1940
 Genus †Baiotomeus Krause, 1987
 Species †B. douglassi Simpson, 1935 [Ptilodus; Mimetodon; Neoplagiaulax]
 Species †B. lamberti Krause, 1987
 Species †B. russelli Scott, Fox & Youzwyshyn, 2002
 Species †B. rhothonion Scott, 2003
 Genus †Prochetodon Jepsen, 1940
 Species †P. cavus Jespen, 1940
 Species †P. foxi Krause, 1987
 Species †P. taxus Krause, 1987
 Species? †P. speirsae Scott, 2004
 Superfamily †Taeniolabidoidea Granger & Simpson, 1929 sensu Kielan-Jaworowska & Hurum, 2001
 Genus †Prionessus Matthew & Granger, 1925
 Species †P. lucifer Matthew & Granger, 1925
 Family †Lambdopsalidae
 Genus †Lambdopsalis Chow & Qi, 1978
 Species †L. bulla Chow & Qi, 1978
 Genus †Sphenopsalis Matthew, Granger & Simpson, 1928
 Species †S. nobilis Matthew, Granger & Simpson, 1928
 Family †Taeniolabididae Granger & Simpson, 1929
 Genus †Taeniolabis Cope, 1882
 Species †T. lamberti Simmons, 1987
 Species †T. taoensis Cope, 1882
 Genus †Kimbetopsalis
 Species †K. simmonsae
 Superfamily †Djadochtatherioidea Kielan-Jaworowska & Hurum, 1997 sensu Kielan-Jaworowska & Hurum, 2001[Djadochtatheria Kielan-Jaworowska & Hurum, 1997]
 Genus? †Bulganbaatar Kielan-Jaworowska, 1974
 Species? †B. nemegtbaataroides Kielan-Jaworowska, 1974
 Genus †Nemegtbaatar Kielan-Jaworowska, 1974
 Species? †N. gobiensis Kielan-Jaworowska, 1974
 Family †Chulsanbaataridae Kielan-Jaworowska, 1974
 Genus †Chulsanbaatar Kielan-Jaworowska, 1974
 Species †C. vulgaris Kielan-Jaworowska, 1974
 Family †Sloanbaataridae Kielan-Jaworowska, 1974
 Genus †Kamptobaatar Kielan-Jaworowska, 1970
 Species? †K. kuczynskii Kielan-Jaworowska, 1970
 Genus †Nessovbaatar Kielan-Jaworowska & Hurum, 1997
 Species †N. multicostatus Kielan-Jaworowska & Hurum, 1997
 Genus †Sloanbaatar Kielan-Jaworowska, 1974
 Species †S. mirabilis Kielan-Jaworowska, 1974 [Sloanbaatarinae]
 Family †Djadochtatheriidae Kielan-Jaworowska $ Hurum, 1997
 Genus †Djadochtatherium Simpson, 1925
 Species †D. matthewi Simpson, 1925[Catopsalis matthewi Simpson, 1925]
 Genus †Catopsbaatar Kielan-Jaworowska, 1974
 Species †C. catopsaloides (Kielan-Jaworowska, 1974) Kielan-Jaworowska, 1994 [Djadochtatherium catopsaloides Kielan-Jaworowska, 1974]
 Genus †Tombaatar Kielan-Jaworowska, 1974
 Species †T. sabuli Rougier, Novacek & Dashzeveg, 1997
 Genus †Kryptobaatar Kielan-Jaworowska, 1970 [Gobibaatar Kielan-Jaworowska, 1970, Tugrigbaatar Kielan-Jaworowska & Dashzeveg, 1978]
 Species †K. saichanensis Kielan-Jaworowska & Dashzeveg, 1978 [Tugrigbaatar saichaenensis Kielan-Jaworowska & Dashzeveg, 1978??]
 Species †K. dashzevegi Kielan-Jaworowska, 1970
 Species †K. mandahuensis  Smith, Guo & Sun, 2001
 Species †K. gobiensis Kielan-Jaworowska, 1970 [Gobibaatar parvus Kielan-Jaworowska, 1970 ]

Phylogeny

Paleoecology

Behaviour
Multituberculates are some of the earliest mammals to display complex social behaviours. One species, Filikomys, from the Late Cretaceous of North America, engaged in multi-generational group nesting and burrowing.

Extinction

The extinction of multituberculates has been a topic of controversy for several decades. After at least 88 million years of dominance over most mammalian assemblies, multituberculates reached the peak of their diversity in the early Palaeocene, before gradually declining across the final stages of the epoch and the Eocene, finally disappearing in the early Oligocene. Traditionally, the extinction of multituberculates has been linked to the rise of rodents (and, to a lesser degree, earlier placental competitors like hyopsodonts and Plesiadapiformes), which supposedly competitively excluded multituberculates from most mammalian faunas.

However, the idea that multituberculates were replaced by rodents and other placentals has been criticised by several authors. For one thing, it relies on the assumption that these mammals are "inferior" to more derived placentals, and ignores the fact that rodents and multituberculates had co-existed for at least 15 million years. According to some researchers, multituberculate "decline" is shaped by sharp extinction events, most notably after the Tiffanian, where a sudden drop in diversity occurs. Finally, the youngest known multituberculates do not exemplify patterns of competitive exclusion; the Oligocene Ectypodus is a rather generalistic species, rather than a specialist. This combination of factors suggests that, rather than gradually declining due to pressure from rodents and similar placentals, multituberculates simply could not cope with climatic and vegetation changes, as well as the rise of new predatory eutherians, such as miacids.

More recent studies show a mixed effect. Multituberculate faunas in North America and Europe do indeed decline in correlation to the introduction of rodents in these areas. However, Asian multituberculate faunas co-existed with rodents with minimal extinction events, implying that competition was not the main cause for the extinction of Asiatic multituberculates. As a whole, it seems that Asian multituberculates, unlike North American and European species, never recovered from the KT event, which allowed the evolution and propagation of rodents in the first place. A recent study seems to indeed indicate that eutherians recovered more quickly from the KT event than multituberculates. Conversely, another study has shown that placental radiation did not start significantly until after the decline of multituberculates.

References

Sources

 
Prehistoric animal orders
Prehistoric mammals
Mammal orders
Oligocene extinctions
Kimmeridgian first appearances
Taxa named by Edward Drinker Cope
Fossil taxa described in 1884
Tertiary extinctions of vertebrate taxa